Albert Rudolph Dennis III (born June 24, 1951) is a former American football offensive guard who played three seasons, for the San Diego Chargers and Cleveland Browns. He played for the Chargers in 1973 and the Browns from 1976 to 1977.

References

Living people
1951 births
San Diego Chargers players
Cleveland Browns players
American football offensive guards
Players of American football from Louisiana
People from Independence, Louisiana
Grambling State Tigers football players